Güneri (literally "hero ( (definite accusative eri)) of the day") is a Turkish surname and toponym and may refer to:

List of surname holders 
 Elif Güneri (born 1987), Turkish footballer
 Güven Güneri (born 1987), Turkish footballer

Place name 
 Güneri, Kozan, village in the District of Kozan, Adana Province, Turkey

Turkish-language surnames